Moga (also Romanized as Mogā; also known as Mogāh, Mogh Gah, Mogh Gāh, and Mogh Geh) is a village in Surak Rural District, Lirdaf District, Jask County, Hormozgan Province, Iran. At the 2006 census, its population was 52, in 11 families.

References 

Populated places in Jask County